Ruhpolding is the municipality with the biggest area of the Traunstein district in southeastern Bavaria, Germany. It is situated in the south of the Chiemgau region in the Alps and next to the Austrian border.

Ruhpolding has a biathlon track. It hosted the 1979, 1985, 1996 and 2012 Biathlon World Championships. It also has a ski jumping hill, Große Zirmbergschanze, where one World Cup event has taken place, in the 1992–93 season.

The economy is based on tourism and sports. In the year 2007 the Mountainbike 24h Race World Championships took place in the Chiemgau Arena. Other sports which are possible for tourists and residents are golf, mountainbiking, shooting, hiking, fly fishing and skiing.

History
The name "Ruhpolding" originates from the Bavarian word Rupoltingin and means "the people of the strong famous one". The town is mentioned as Ruhpoldingen for the first time in 1193.

It was connected to the railway in 1895. Since 1948, Ruhpolding has been a famous spa and tourist resort, especially for winter sports. The accommodation figures were 600,000 overnight stays per year in the mid 1950s, which increased to 1,122,732 overnight stays per year in 1991.

People 
 Ferdinand Max Bredt German Orientalist painter.
 Andreas Wellinger, Olympic champion in ski jumping
 Georg von Hertling, the German Chancellor from 1917 to 1918, died here
 Vanessa Hinz, German biathlete
 Wolfgang Pichler, Biathlon Coach
 Ilse Braun sister of Eva and Gretl Braun.

Mayors 
 ?–1893: Anton Pointner 
 1893–1906: Mathias Huber (BBB)
 1906–1919: Georg Eisenberger (BBB)
 1919–1933: Bartholomäus Schmucker
 1933 until the end of war: Anton Kreidl, Josef Wallner, Karl Huber
 1945 and 1946: Alois Rappl, Valentin Plenk, Fritz Grübl
 1946–1966: Josef Mayer (CSU)
 1966–1970: Leonhard Schmucker (CSU)
 1970–1972: Anton Stengel (UW)
 1972–1978: Franz Schneider (SPD)
 1978–1996: Herbert Ohl (CSU)
 1996–2002: Gerhard Hallweger (SPD)
 2002–2008: Andreas Hallweger (CSU)
 2008–2020: Claus Pichler (SPD)
 since 2020: Justus Pfeifer (CSU)

References

External links

 Village of Ruhpolding

Traunstein (district)
Ski areas and resorts in Germany